is a district located in Iwate Prefecture, Japan.

As of June 1, 2019, the district has an estimated population of 15,451 and a density of 86 persons per km2. The total area is 179.76 km2.

The district has only one town.
Kanegasaki

Mergers
On February 20, 2006 the municipalities of Maesawa, Isawa and Koromogawa merged with the cities of Esashi and Mizusawa to form the new city of Ōshū.

References 

Districts in Iwate Prefecture